Edgar Castillo Salinas (born 17 April 1957) is a Bolivian footballer. He played in ten matches for the Bolivia national football team from 1983 to 1985. He was also part of Bolivia's squad for the 1983 Copa América tournament.

References

External links
 

1957 births
Living people
Bolivian footballers
Bolivia international footballers
Place of birth missing (living people)
Association football midfielders
Club Blooming players